Fostoria is a city located at the convergence of Hancock, Seneca, and Wood counties in the northwestern part of the U.S. state of Ohio.

The city is known for its railroads, as approximately 100 trains pass through the city each day.  The city is often visited by railfans, and a railroad viewing park, constructed in 2013 (dedicated 14 November 2013) hosts many railfans every day in a purpose-built viewing platform.  Fostoria was also the home for over a dozen glass factories during the end of the 19th century.  The glass factories were established in Fostoria because of the discovery of natural gas in the area.  As the gas supply became depleted, many of the factories closed or moved—including the Fostoria Glass Company.  Fostoria's most famous citizen is Charles Foster (son of the man who helped establish Fostoria), who became governor of Ohio.

The community grew substantially during the end of the 19th century, coinciding with the northwest Ohio gas boom.  Typical of Rust Belt cities, Fostoria peaked in size in 1970. The population was 13,046 at the 2020 Census, slightly down from 13,441 at the 2010 Census.

Name and general background
Fostoria was created in 1854 with the merger of the communities of Rome and Risdon.  The combination of both communities' Methodist churches, on land donated by Charles W. Foster, led to the merger.  To show their appreciation for Mr. Foster's generosity, the new community was named Fostoria.  Charles W. Foster's son,  Charles, became one of Fostoria's most famous citizens—becoming the 35th governor of Ohio and U.S. Secretary of the Treasury under President Benjamin Harrison.

Fostoria is known for its glass heritage and railroads: two CSX main lines and one NS main line intersect in downtown Fostoria, an area called the "Iron Triangle."  A natural gas boom in the 1880s, the railroad lines, and recruiting efforts by the community caused Fostoria to become home for numerous glass factories, including the Mambourg Glass Company (the city's first glass factory), the Fostoria Glass Company, the Seneca Glass Company, the Novelty Glass Company, and others.

Although the boom in gas and glass is long over, railroads continue to be important to the community.  More than 100 trains pass through Fostoria each day. The Fostoria Railroad Preservation Society, aided by a $815,760 grant from the Ohio Department of Transportation, completed a train viewing park in 2013 to help capitalize on the thousands of railfans who visit yearly.

Geography
Fostoria is located at  (41.159243, -83.415239).

Public water system 
The City of Fostoria operates a community public water system that serves a population of approximately 15,000 people and has 5,500 metered service connections. The City of Fostoria also provides water to the Village of Arcadia with a population of 537.

The water treatment system obtains its water from the East Branch of the Portage River. Most of the water is stored in six upground reservoirs. The system also has three groundwater wells that currently serve as the back-up source for the city. Plant design capacity is 6.08 million gallons per day, but current average production is about 2.2 million gallons per day.

Water from the East Branch of the Portage River is pumped into Fostoria's six upground reservoirs.

Demographics

2010 census
As of the census of 2010, there were 13,441 people, 5,417 households, and 3,432 families living in the city. The racial makeup of the city was 84.1% White, 6.4% African American, 0.1% Native American, 0.4% Asian, 4.3% from other races, and 4.7% from two or more races. Hispanic or Latino of any race were 11.5% of the population.

There were 5,417 households, of which 33.0% had children under the age of 18 living with them, 39.1% were married couples living together, 17.3% had a female householder with no husband present, 7.0% had a male householder with no wife present, and 36.6% were non-families. 31.3% of all households were made up of individuals, and 13.7% had someone living alone who was 65 years of age or older. The average household size was 2.42 and the average family size was 2.97.

The median age in the city was 37.9 years. 26% of residents were under the age of 18; 8.3% were between the ages of 18 and 24; 23.9% were from 25 to 44; 25.8% were from 45 to 64; and 16% were 65 years of age or older. The gender makeup of the city was 47.3% male and 52.7% female.

2000 census
As of the census of 2000, there were 13,931 people, 5,565 households, and 3,628 families living in the city. The population density was 1,917.6 people per square mile (740.9/km2). There were 6,024 housing units at an average density of 829.2 per square mile (320.4/km2). The racial makeup of the city was 87.32% White, 5.75% African American, 0.19% Native American, 0.48% Asian, 3.60% from other races, and 2.66% from two or more races. Hispanic or Latino of any race were 7.92% of the population.

There were 5,565 households, out of which 32.0% had children under the age of 18 living with them, 44.9% were married couples living together, 15.1% had a female householder with no husband present, and 34.8% were non-families. 29.6% of all households were made up of individuals, and 12.7% had someone living alone who was 65 years of age or older. The average household size was 2.46 and the average family size was 3.03.

In the city the population was spread out, with 27.0% under the age of 18, 8.8% from 18 to 24, 27.7% from 25 to 44, 20.8% from 45 to 64, and 15.6% who were 65 years of age or older. The median age was 36 years. For every 100 females, there were 90.3 males. For every 100 females age 18 and over, there were 87.0 males.

The median income for a household in the city was $31,166, and the median income for a family was $38,427. Males had a median income of $31,476 versus $22,016 for females. The per capita income for the city was $15,568. About 9.0% of families and 11.2% of the population were below the poverty line, including 14.1% of those under age 18 and 7.0% of those age 65 or over.

Churches
The city is the home of St. Wendelin Catholic Church, located at 323 N Wood St, Fostoria, OH 44830. The church is in a part of Fostoria that is in Hancock County, Ohio. The Parish also has a very large cemetery aptly named St. Wendelin Catholic Cemetery  and they have maps for finding the various sections available online. St. Wendelin Church began as a mission in 1848.

Transportation
The city is served by one airport, called Fostoria Metropolitan Airport.
Fostoria was served by the Three Rivers Amtrak Service which ran between Chicago and New York City on CSX's B&O line until train service there ended in March 2005.

The city is the site where the Norfolk Southern Railway's ex-Nickel Plate Road mainline crosses the previously mentioned CSX ex-B&O and ex-C&O lines. The three crossings form a triangle, with the site known as the "Iron Triangle." The area is a popular spot for railfans and has a park located in the center between the three mainlines.

Band championships
VFW Post 421 of Fostoria won ten consecutive national titles for marching bands and concert bands.  All titles were earned under the direction of Richard S. "Dick" Downs.

Notable people

 Charlie Earl, former Ohio State Representative, Libertarian Party candidate in the 2014 Ohio gubernatorial election
 Charles Foster, son of Fostoria's namesake, former governor of Ohio, former United States Secretary of the Treasury
 Edward R. Hays, soldier, lawyer and politician (Republican U.S. representative representing the Iowa's 7th congressional district from 1890 to 1891)
 Joseph R. Hinrichs President and CEO, CSX Corporation
 Micah Hyde, football player
 Grant Jackson, baseball player
 Tony Lucadello, baseball scout
 Damon Moore, football player
 John Quinn, art collector
 Gene Sharp, nonviolent action scholar and Nobel Peace Prize Nominee
 Harold L. Yochum, American theologian, church leader and ninth President of Capital University

References

External links

 City of Fostoria official website

 
Cities in Ohio
Cities in Hancock County, Ohio
Cities in Seneca County, Ohio
Cities in Wood County, Ohio
Populated places established in 1854
1854 establishments in Ohio